Tõlli is a village in Tõstamaa Parish, Pärnu County, in southwestern Estonia. It is located just southeast of Tõstamaa, the administrative centre of the municipality, on the coast of the Gulf of Riga. Tõlli has a population of 44 (as of 1 January 2011).

Tõrvanõmme pine, one of the fattest trees in Estonia, is located in Tõlli village.

References

Villages in Pärnu County